Tetragonolepis (from  , 'four', 'angle', and   'scale') is an extinct genus of bony fish belonging to the Semionotiformes family Semionotidae.

References

Sources
 In the Shadow of the Dinosaurs: Early Mesozoic Tetrapods by Nicholas C. Fraser and Hans-Dieter Sues

Semionotiformes
Fossil taxa described in 1830
Early Jurassic fish
Mesozoic fish of Europe